Romano Ricciardi (born 1986) is an Italian/Swiss Jazz-Saxophonist.

Born in Zürich, Switzerland in 1986.  Romano developed an early interest in music listening to old jazz musicians like Charlie Parker, Sonny Stitt, Cannonball Adderley, Lou Donaldson, Sonny Rollins, Hank Mobley, Dexter Gordon, John Coltrane and many others.

He began to play the saxophone at age 10 autodidactically. At the age of 12 he played in a funk/blues band with his older  brother  Alessandro who is a pianist.   They won the  second  price at  a  newcomer contest.
By the time he was 14 he performed with local jazz ensembles in different jazz clubs.   In 2004 he moved to Bern, where he studied for one year with  George Robert and for another with  Andy  Scherrer at the  Swiss Jazz School. At this time he used to play in a quartet with his brother  Alessandro on piano,  Thomas  Dürst on bass and Ueli Müller on drums and he took part in several jazz projects.

In 2006 he went for an exchange to Sicily, Italy, to get to know better his second native country.
Back to Switzerland he moved back to Zürich, where he continued his studies at the Jazz School Bern and Zürich.

In February 2008 he released his first album entitled "Remembering Bird - A Tribute to Charlie Parker", which he recorded at the  Radio DRS Studio 2 with the great bassist  Giorgos  Antoniou,  Alessandro Ricciardi and two musicians from the UK: Steve Brown (drummer Scott Hamilton quartet) and Steve Fishwick (trumpet – played with Anita ‘O Day, Cedar Walton etc.).

Romano played in several Jazzclubs, like Moods Zürich, Mehrspur, "Isebähndli" Baden, Jazzclub Thalwil, Chorus Lausanne, Jazzkantine Luzern, Jazznojazz festival and performed with the Swiss All-Star-Big-Band 2009 (Guillermo Klein).
In 2010 he got his master's degree in arts of music and pedagogy.

In 2006 Romano Ricciardi and his brother Alessandro founded LiveJazz.Ch.

Sources 
http://www.romanoricciardi.com
http://www.livejazz.ch

1986 births
Living people
Italian jazz saxophonists
Male saxophonists
Swiss jazz musicians
Musicians from Zürich
21st-century saxophonists
21st-century Italian male musicians
Male jazz musicians